Colonel Harry Albert "Paddy" Flint (February 12, 1888 – July 24, 1944) was an officer of the United States Army who served with distinction during World War II. Although at 56 years of age he was considerably older than was considered generally acceptable for field-grade front-line infantry officers, he is most known for leading the 39th Infantry Regiment from its service in Sicily from July 1943 until he was mortally wounded six weeks after the Normandy landings in June 1944.

Early life
Harry Albert Flint was born in St. Johnsbury, Vermont, on February 12, 1888, the third of seven children born to Mabel and Charles G. Flint. Inspired by stories of returning veterans of the Spanish–American War, by age 11 he was decided upon a military career.

Flint was educated in St. Johnsbury, and graduated from St. Johnsbury Academy in 1907.  He took the entrance examination for the United States Military Academy and scored well, but there were no vacancies, so he did not receive an appointment. He attended Norwich University for six months in preparation to enter West Point, and in May 1907 he was appointed to the United States Naval Academy. He attended the Naval Academy until March 1908, when he received an appointment to West Point.

Flint graduated from West Point in 1912 ranked 41 of 95. He received his commission as a second lieutenant of Cavalry was assigned to the 4th Cavalry Regiment.

Start of career
Flint served initially with the 4th Cavalry at Schofield Barracks, Hawaii and in Manila, Philippines. During the Pancho Villa Expedition of 1916, Flint was stationed at Fort Riley, Kansas, and his request for service on the border with Mexico was turned down. When it appeared that the United States would enter World War I in 1917, Flint transferred to the Field Artillery, hoping this would facilitate an assignment to a combat unit.

World War I
Flint served in France during World War I, and his regiment provided replacement soldiers for units on the front lines. After the war was brought to an end due to the Armistice with Germany on November 11, 1918, he joined the Third Army—the Army of Occupation—in Koblenz, Germany.  Flint performed several staff assignments, including employing his cavalry background to serve as a remount officer. He received the Czechoslovak War Cross 1918 from a grateful Czech government, which appreciated his honesty when buying and selling horses.  Flint was also commended by his commander after he prevented the detonation of a trainload of high explosives during a fire at an ammunition dump by taking over the controls of a switch engine and maneuvering the train through the flames to safety.

Post-World War I
Flint returned to the United States in 1921, and his post-war assignments included: instructor at the U.S. Army Cavalry School; attendance at the General Service School and U.S. Army Command and General Staff College, and professor of military science at the New Mexico Military Institute. He attended Ecole Supérieure de Guerre in Paris and became fluent in French.  Flint also performed staff duty on the office of the Chief of Cavalry and at the Air Corps Tactical School. After serving with the 1st Cavalry Regiment at Fort Knox, Kentucky from 1933 to 1935, he was promoted to lieutenant colonel as head of the ROTC program at the University of Illinois. From 1939 to 1941, Flint served with the 5th Cavalry Regiment. The last month of 1941 saw the United States officially enter World War II.

World War II
Assigned to the 2nd Armored Division, Flint commanded the 56th Armored Infantry Regiment, for which he received the Legion of Merit. Later assigned to the U.S. II Corps, Flint took part in the invasion of North Africa  (Operation Torch) as part of the corps G-3 (operations and training) staff and as a liaison officer to the French headquarters in Algiers. For his service with the French, Flint received the Legion of Honor (Chevalier).

Hoping for a combat assignment despite his advanced age, Flint approached the new II Corps commander, Major General Omar Bradley directly in April 1943, shortly before the Allied invasion of Sicily (Operation Husky) and requested combat duty. Soon afterwards, Flint was assigned as commander of the Headquarters Detachment of the 2nd Armored Division.

39th Infantry Regiment
In mid-July 1943, Flint was appointed to command the 39th Infantry Regiment while fighting was still ongoing in Sicily.  The 39th Infantry had fought in North Africa and Sicily, and had sustained numerous casualties.  In addition, the regimental commander had to be evacuated after breaking his leg in an accident.  The 39th Infantry was a unit of the 9th Infantry Division; when division commander Manton Eddy requested a new commander for the 39th Infantry Regiment, Bradley recommended Flint, and Eddy accepted.  Flint took immediate steps to restore the regiment's morale and fighting spirit.  He gained notoriety for some activities, with Seventh Army commander George S. Patton commenting at one point that "Paddy Flint is clearly nuts, but he fights well."  In a letter to his wife Beatrice, written on June 17, 1944, Patton wrote, prophetically: "Paddy is in and took a town.  He expects to be killed and probably will be."

Flint led his regiment during continued fighting in Sicily, including the Battle of Troina, for which he received the Distinguished Service Cross.

AAA-O
The 39th Infantry regiment's slogan, "Anything, Anytime, Anywhere - Bar Nothing", also known as the Triple-A Bar Nothing slogan, was given to the regiment by Colonel Flint.  This slogan, in which the regiment took great pride, was displayed on their helmets and vehicles, even in combat. Using such readily identifiable markings was against orders, as they could give the enemy valuable intelligence as to the units and leaders they faced in battle, but Flint disregarded the risk, declaring, "The enemy who sees our regiment in combat, if they live through the battle, will know to run the next time they see us coming."  When Flint received command of the regiment it was somewhat of a lackluster outfit, but his enthusiasm and this slogan helped to turn it into an effective fighting unit.

The AAA-O slogan also showed up in a strange stamp cancellation that had some people wondering what on earth it meant.  Apparently, Paddy's 39th Infantry had so impressed the German Army that they used the unit's slogan/logo on a pseudo-cancellation on a propaganda postage stamp.  An article by Jerry Jensen, explains the story.

Normandy invasion
Flint commanded his regiment throughout fighting in Normandy after arriving on Utah Beach at D-Day plus four.  He became known for his "lead from the front" style and fearless demeanor; he received three awards of the Silver Star for heroism in France.

On July 23, 1944, the 39th Infantry was advancing on the Saint-Lô-Périers road when it was held up by heavy mortar fire. Leading from his customary place on the front, Flint and a rifle patrol soon discovered a German pillbox. Flint reported the location by radio and called for tank support. When the tank arrived, Flint rode atop it as it sprayed the hedgerows with machine gun fire.  After the tank driver was wounded, Flint dismounted and continued to advance with the rifle patrol.

Death and burial

Flint was hit by a sniper's bullet as led the patrol into the shelter of a farmhouse during the fighting on the Saint-Lô-Périers road.  Medical aid men and stretcher bearers evacuated him to a treatment area behind the lines, where Flint died the following day.  He was buried at United States Military Cemetery No. 2 in Ste-Mere-Eglise, France. In 1948, Flint was reinterred at Section 2, Site 310 of Arlington National Cemetery.  For the action in which he was killed, Flint received a second award of the Distinguished Service Cross.

Family
In August 1912, Flint married Sallie Helena Emery of Chelsea, Vermont, whom he met while both were students at St. Johnsbury Academy. They were the parents of a daughter, Sallie.

References

External links
Arlington National Cemetery web page for "Paddy" Flint
"Paddy: The Colorful Story of Colonel Harry A. "Paddy" Flint" by Robert A. Anderson

1888 births
1944 deaths
United States Army Field Artillery Branch personnel
Military personnel from Vermont
People from Caledonia County, Vermont
United States Army colonels
United States Army personnel of World War I
United States Army personnel killed in World War II
United States Military Academy alumni
United States Army Command and General Staff College alumni
Air Corps Tactical School alumni
Recipients of the Distinguished Service Cross (United States)
Recipients of the Silver Star
Recipients of the Legion of Merit
Burials at Arlington National Cemetery